Charan (IAST: Cāraṇ; Sanskrit: चारण; Gujarati: ચારણ; Urdu: چارڻ ; IPA: cɑːrəɳə) is a caste in South Asia natively residing in the Rajasthan and Gujarat states of India, as well as the Sindh and Balochistan provinces of Pakistan. Historically, Charans have been engaged in diverse occupations like bards, poets, historians, pastoralists, agriculturalists and also administrators,  jagirdars and warriors and some even as traders.

Historical roles and occupations

Poets and historians 
Rajasthani & Gujarati literature from the early and medieval period, upto the 19th century, has been mainly composed by Charans. The relationship between Charans and Rajputs is deeprooted in history. As Charans used to partake in battles alongside Rajputs, they were witnesses not only to battles but also to many other occasions and episodes forming part of the contemporary Rajput life. The poems composed about such wars and incidents had two qualities: basic historical truth and vivid, realistic and pictorial descriptions, particularly of heroes, heroic deeds and battles.

The Chāran poetry is mostly descriptive in style and can be categorized in two forms: narrative and stray. The narrative form of Charan poetry goes by various names viz., Rās, Rāsau, Rūpak, Prakās, Chhand, Vilās, Prabandh, Āyan, Sanvād, etc. These poems are also named after metres such as, Kavitt, Kundaliyā, Jhūlaņā, Nīsāṇī, Jhamāl and Veli etc. Poems of stray form also use a variety of such metres. Written in Dingal, the various sources, known as bata (vata), khyata, vigata, pidhiavali, and vamsavali, form the most important body of primary data for the study of the medieval period.

Although, for Charans, poetic composition and recitation was only a hereditary 'pastime', subordinate to the primary income producing occupations of military service, agriculture, and horse and cattle trading. Ambitious and talented boys, however, pursued traditional education from other learned Charans for comprehensive guidance. When accepted by them as students, they would receive training in the basics of poetic composition and narration as well as the specialized languages by precept and example, with emphasis on memorization and oral recitation. Students would in turn recite the compositions, constantly improving their style. Knowledge of languages such as Dingal, Sanskrit, Urdu, and Persian was also acquired with the aid of specialized masters. Thus, subjects studied included not only history and literature, but also religion, music, and astrology.

Renowned Charan poets of the time were part of the royal courts, attaining the rank of Kaviraja or "court-laureate" and assuming positions of great influence. Such learned Charans were exceptionally honoured by the rulers. The rulers bestowed awards whose value amounted to lakh(a hundred thousand) or krore(in million), hence these were termed as Lakh Pasav or Krore Pasav. These awards consisted of sasan lands, horses, elephants, and ornaments.

Administrators 
As per their administrative and ritual positions, Charans were integral to numerous indigenous courts in the region including Rajputana, Saurashtra, Malwa, Kutch, Sindh, and Gujarat. They served various administrative and diplomatic functions, sometimes as leading state dignitaries.

By nineteenth century, these formed major and minor bureaucratic lineages which played a significant role in the power struggle and the policy formation in the princely states. Recruitment to positions in the political bureaucracy in the nineteenth century states of Rajputana was based on the community and the recognized and established lineages. Charan as an indigenous community with traditions of literacy and service contributed significantly in the senior crown appointments. Persons belonging to such an administrative class, as a result of state service, were also granted jagirs and court honours. During the medieval period, Charans along with Rajputs and Baniyas dominated the administration in princely states. Charans enjoyed intimate relations with the rulers who placed high confidence in them; consequently, they came to play the role of mediators in most of the political matters in the medieval kingdoms prior to British rule.

Some of the prominent Charan administrators holding positions such as of Diwan (Prime Minister) in 19th & 20th century were Kaviraja Shyamaldas of Mewar, Kaviraja Murardan of Marwar, and Ramnathji Ratnu of Kishengarh. The Ratnu family of Sikar formed one such bureaucratic lineage whose members were Diwans of Sikar, Idar, Kishengarh, and Jhalawad.

Warriors and military role 
Charans were an integral part of the military , administrative , political and social system of the medieval kingdoms. Similar to the Rajputs, with whom they were often associated, Charans would consume meat, alcohol, and participate in martial activities. They were known for their loyalty and were respected by the rulers for their skills in chivalry and sacrifice on the battlefield. 

Numerous Charans have fought bravely to the end in the decisive battles of Mewar. The roll of honour during the reigns of various rulers such as Sanga and Pratap contains the names of prominent Charans. Karamsi Ashiya fought in the Battle of Maholi in favour of Udai Singh II against Banvir. In the Battle of Haldighati, many of them fought for Mewar including Charans of Sonyana led by Jaisaji and Keshavji Sauda,  as well as Ramaji and Kanhaji Sandu, Govardhan and Abhaychand Boksha, Ramdas Dharmawat, etc.

In the Khilji's invasion of Jalore in 1311 CE, Sahaj Pal Gadan died fighting valiantly alongside Kanhadadeva against Alauddin Khilji. Kanhaji Arha slained Sanga, the Raja of Amber and founder of Sanganer, thus avenging the death of his friend Karamchand Naruka. Hapaji Barhath of Marwar fought for the Mughals in the Battle of Ahmedabad, leading an army of one hundred elephants under his command. Narupal Kavia was a commander in Man Singh's forces during the Mughal conquest of Orissa. During an ambush by Sultan Qatlu Khan's large army, he, Bika Rathor, and Mahesh Das made a last stand and bravely sacrificed their lives while the rest of the imperial force fled.

In the Gujarat region, Charans served in the army in large numbers. The Tumbel clan was especially prominent, with many of its members serving in the army of Jam Raval, the founder of Jamnagar State. Throughout history, the Jadeja rulers of Saurashtra sent troops under the leadership of Charans to fight on various occasions. 

In the famous Battle of Dharmat in 1658 CE, four renowned warriors - Khidiya Jagmal Dharmawat, Barhath Jasraj Venidasot, Bhimajal Misran, and Dharmaji Charan - valiantly fought on the side of Maharaja Jaswant Singh and Ratan Singh Rathore and perished. When Durgadas planned the rescue of Ajit Singh, the Battle of Delhi saw Charan Samdan and Mishan Ratan become martyrs for their homeland in their fight against the Mughals. Charan Jogidas, Mishan Bharmal, Sarau, Asal Dhanu & Vithu Kanau were the chosen warriors who escorted Prince Akbar to Sambhaji's court.

Chandidas Charan of Alwar faced off against Nawab Najaf Khan at Thana Gazi for a month halting his march to a standstill until Chandidas was called back to Alwar by Pratap Singh. Bhupati Ram Charan was the General of the Hada army of Kota who made a strong stand in the Battle of Rajamahal. Similarly, Kaviraja Bhairav Dan was the Commandant of the Army of Bikaner State in 19th-century. 

At many places in Gujarat, Charans had revolted against the British during the mutiny of 1857. Kandas, the Charan Panchmahal chief, was a trusted ally of the Baroda Resident who sought Kandas' help to gain Charan support for the British. However, Kandas raised Bahadur Shah Zafar's banner, gathering Koli chiefs and retired sepoys from Panchmahal to come to mutineers' aid.

Arbitrators and diplomats 
Charans fulfilled the crucial role of diplomats, guarantors, and arbitrators in political negotiations and financial transactions. No treaties between kings after a war or contracts between patrons and clients were considered valid without a Chāran acting as a guarantor. Since the Charans were deemed sacrosanct and causing them harm was considered a sin, they were chosen as sureties whenever a legal guarantee was required. Therefore, important pacts, engagements, transfers, recovery of debts, transactions, and even the signing of treaties were always presided by a Charan. Records indicate, they also served as sureties for the collection of land revenue from the sixteenth century down to 1816.

In the cases when these contracts were not honoured or when the Charans themselves were subjected to an injustice, they would wound, even immolate, or mutilate themselves, thus casting curse of the death of a Charan on the offender. The mark of the dagger, signifying the threat of self-sacrifice, served as their signature.

Morever, they were the traditional arbitrators of conflicts between the various Rajput clans or branches. Rajput clans would send their families and children to the homes of Charans for safeguarding during times of violence. The role of messengers and mediators was taken over by Charans in negotiations between hostile or warring groups. They acted as emissaries in times of war. Even the British called upon the Charans to mediate the Saurashtra peace agreements of the early nineteenth century.

The British colonial intervention in the administration of the princely states, in time, brought decline in these functions of the Charans. However, well into the colonial period, Charans continued to perform this long-standing functions of theirs, to serve as witnesses or guarantors in commercial transactions and financial contracts. Prior to the Charans revolting during the Indian Rebellion of 1857, they were part of the `loyal’ Central Gujrat British network, acting as mediators between princes and the people, or princes and the British.

Traders and merchants 
They took advantage of their sacred position by assuming the occupation of carriers and traders as they were exempted from the payment of customs duties in Rajputana and the adjacent regions of Malwa and Gujarat in the pre-colonial period.Exercising their privilege to transport goods between various states with impunity and utilising the large wealth of cattle as pack animals, Charans were able to establish a "virtual monopoly of trade in North-Western India". Many Charans are said to have become wealthy merchants and money-lenders. Their caravans were considered to be insured against bandits. In Rajasthan, the Kachhela Charans excelled as merchants.

Utilizing their favourable position since they had "exemption from perpetual and harassing imposts...they gradually became chief carriers and traders". In Mallani, Charans were described as "large traders" possessing great privileges as a sacred race being exempted from local dues throughout Marwar.

Charan traders took large caravans of bullocks north to Marwar and Hindustan, and east to Malwa through Gujarat. They traded in various commodities including ivory, coconuts, alum, and dry dates which they take from Kutch while bringing back corn and tobacco from Marwar & Hindustan. Ivory, brought from Africa to Mandvi in Gujarat, was bought by Charan traders in return for grain and coarse cloth. From there, they transported ivory to be sold in Marwar.

By late seventeenth and eighteenth centuries, they emerged as major suppliers of goods and weaponry to the warring armies of Mughal, Rajput, and other factions. They sold their goods in the markets ranging from Punjab to Maharashtra.

The Salt-Trade in Marwar involved thousands of people & pack animals like oxen & camels. Charans along with Pushkarna Brahmins and Bhils were engaged in salt-trade and exempted from the payment of custom duties. Kachhela Charans from Sindhari used to collect salt from Talwara & sell in other parts of Marwar. Charans were seen as, “great traders...who...paid no dues and in troubled times when plunder was rife...although trading with thousands of rupees worth of property were never molested”.

The Charan traders made their encampments as fortified settlements whenever a long hault was required, either due to the long journey or as safeguard against lawless bandits and periodical rains. Sometimes, these fortified settlements evolved as forts such as those of Bhainsrorgarh. Some of the Charan merchants were the privileged carriers of the Rajawaras (kingdoms) and thus had direct communication with the royal household. Their caravans also consisted of armies to safeguard their goods and encampments. Documents of princely states like Kota records the names of several Charans as the affluent merchants of the region with their huge caravans trading with markets in western India.

The establishment of British hegemony in northwestern India and subsequent colonial intervention on trade practices such as monopoly on salt and introduction of railways affected overall trading patterns leading to irreversabe decline of communities in transportation business including Charans, Lohanas, and Banjaras. As a result, some of them settled as traders and money-lenders while others took to agriculture.

James Tod in the eighteenth century commented on the Kachhela Charans in Mewar who were traders by profession: It was a novel and interesting scene: the manly persons of the Charans, clad in the flowing white robe, with the high loose folded turban inclined on one side, from which the mala, or chaplet, was gracefully suspended; the Naiks, or leaders, with their massive necklaces of gold, with the image of the pitresvaras (the ancestors) depending therefrom, gave the whole an air of opulence and dignity.

Protectors of mercantile trade 
The Charans held the reputation of defending the merchandise entrusted to their charge through sword and shield if necessary; or else, if outnumbered, by threatening to take, or even taking, their own life.Charans were described as "greatest carriers of goods" for delivery in important centres of Malpura, Pali, Sojat, Ajmer, and Bhilwara by acting as escorts(bailers). Throughout Rajasthan, Gujarat, and Malwa (Madhya Pradesh), Charans acted as escorters and protectors of mercantile trade throughout the journey. The route of the caravans was through Suigam(Gujarat), Sanchor, Bhinmal, Jalor to Pali. The inviolability of a Charan along with their knowledge of the trade routes distinguished them as ideal caravan escorts. Caravans of horses, camels and pack oxen carrying various commodities passed through desolate stretches of desert & forested hills which were always under threat of bandits & dacoits. Charans acted as the protectors & escorts.  As caravan protectors, "sacred Charans" thwarted the attempts of bandits.

If not strong enough to defend their convoy with sword and shield, they would threaten to kill themselves. Given the position of Charans in the socio-cultural system of the time, the wilful killing of a Charan was equivalent to equally abominable crime of killing a Brahmin. As such, if a Charan did commit suicide over any transgression of the caravans under his guardianship, the marauder-robbers responsible for the suicide were deemed to have "earned the sin of a Charan's death, with all its post-life connotations of hell-fire and damnation." Thus, under the safety of Charans, commodities were transported from one region to another.

Horse trade 
Horse trade was one of the prominent occupations of Charans. Some Charan sub-groups like Kachhela Charans(from Kutch & Sindh) and Sorathia Charans(from Kathiawar) were historically engaged in horse breeding & trading. The common connection of horses also led to bonds between Charans & the Kathi tribe. Some Kuchela Charans settled around Mallani(Barmer, Rajasthan) in western Rajasthan which was notable for its horse-breeding. Marwari horses from this area came to be known as Mallani horses. By the 18th century, most of the horse trade business in the Bikaner kingdom was controlled by Charans, besides Afghans. Charan horse dealers were considered to be very well networked. In another example of the clout of horse-trading Charans, a Charan from the Kachhela subgroup arrived at the court of Marwar ruler, Maharaja Takhat Singh, under the auspices of the sect leader of Nath Sampradaya, and marketed his horses, with 10 horses being directly purchased by the ruler himself.

Social structure 

Members of the caste are considered to be divine by a large section of society. Women of the caste are adored as mother goddesses by other major communities of this region including, Khatris and Rajputs. For centuries, Charans were known for their reputation of preferring to die rather than break a promise. Charan society is based on written genealogy. A Charan will consider all the other Charans as equal even if they do not know each other and have radically different economic or geographic status. Charan men are also known as the sacrosanct guides of camel and pack oxen and caravans through Thar desert and as traders in horses, wool and salts , suppliers of food and weaponry to armies.

Anil Chandra Banerjee, a professor of history, has said that  Banerjee's opinion is shared by another historian, G. N. Sharma, who said that

Clans and divisions 
Based on regions inhabited and associated culture, there are multiple endogamous sections among the Charans such as Maru (Rajasthan & Sindh), Kachhela (Kutch), Sorath (Saurashtra), Parajia, Malwa (Madhya Pradesh), etc. Clans among Maru-Charans are Roharia, Detha, Ratnu, Ashiya, Mehru, Kiniya, Sauda, Arha, etc. Kachhelas are divided into 7 main exogamous clans: Nara, Chorada, Chunva, Avsura, Maru, Bati, and Tumbel.

Culture and ethos 
Charans mainly worship various forms of Shakti and incarnations of Hinglaj. They greet one another with 'Jai Mataji Ki' (Victory to the Mother Goddess). The women observed social customs such as purdah (women seclusion) and widow remarriage was forbidden. Before Indian independence in 1947, a sacrifice of a male buffalo constituted a major part of the celebration of Navratri. Such celebrations quite often used to be presided over by Charan women.

Patronized groups 
There are seven categories of people who are historically patronized by the Charans:—

 Kulguru Brahmins: The kulguru brahmins of the Charans come from Ujjain and travel from village to village and register the names of their hosts after receiving donations.
 Purohits: Priests of Charans from Rajpurohit (Rajguru) community who also tie rakhi (rakshasutra) to the Charans.
 Rawals: The Rawal Brahmins record their genealogy and also present various swang (forms of dance).
 Motisars: Motisars compose poems in honor of Charans.
 Bhats (Ravaji): They are professional genealogists of the Charans. They also receive neg (gifts) on marriages. The genealogists of both the Charans and the Rathores of Marwar are from the 'Chandisa' sept of Bhats.
 3 types of Dholis:
 Dhola
 Birampota
 Goyandpota
 Manganiyars: Hereditary professional folk-musicians.

Opium usage 
Charans used to enjoy consumption of opium (also known as Afeem or Amal in regional languages), practices which are also popular among the Rajputs of this region. The usage of opium by Charans was considered necessary for important ceremonies & social gatherings. At weddings, the bride and the bridegroom would take opium together in the presence of their kinsmen. Other occasions where it was suitable to take opium were betrothals, weddings, the birth of a male child, parting of the beard, reconciliations, at visit of a son-in law, after a death, and on festivals such as 'Akhatij'. In Saurashtra, during British rule, it was found that around a half of the total opium consumers were from Charan and Rajput communities.

Contributions to Indian literature 
A whole genre of literature is known as Charan literature. The Dingal language and literature exist largely due to this caste. Zaverchand Meghani divides Charani sahitya (literature) into thirteen subgenres:
Songs in praise of gods and goddesses (stavan)
 Songs in praise of heroes, saints and patrons (birdavalo)
 Descriptions of war (varanno)
 Rebukes of wavering great kings and men who use their power for evil (upalambho)
 Mockery of a standing treachery of heroism (thekadi)
 Love stories
 Laments for dead warriors, patrons and friends (marasiya or vilap kavya)
 Praise of natural beauty, seasonal beauty and festivals
 Descriptions of weapons
 Songs in praise of lions, horses, camels, and buffalo
 Sayings about didactic and practical cleverness
 Ancient epics
 Songs describing the anguish of people in times of famine and adversity

Other classifications of Charani sahitya are Khyatas (chronicles), Vartas and Vatas (stories), Raso (martial epics), Veli - Veli Krishan Rukman ri, Doha-Chhand (verses).

References

Bibliography 

Charan
Indian castes
Indian surnames
Ethnic groups in India
Ethnic groups in Pakistan
Ethnic groups in South Asia
Social groups of Haryana
Social groups of Rajasthan
Social groups of Gujarat
Social groups of Madhya Pradesh
Social groups of Maharashtra
Social groups of Sindh
Social groups of Balochistan, Pakistan
Social groups of Pakistan
Tribes of Kutch
Sindhi tribes
Maldhari communities
Hindu communities
Hindu communities of Pakistan